El Monte Transit provides mass transportation in the Los Angeles suburb of El Monte, California. Five local routes complement the Los Angeles County Metropolitan Transportation Authority's crosstown routes through the city.

Route overview
As of July 2015, El Monte Transit operates 5 fixed routes operating in loops with terminal at El Monte Trolley Station on Centre Avenue. In addition, two shuttle services also connect commuters with the Metrolink Station, with one of these also serving El Monte MTA Station.

Fixed-Route Transit

 Trolley buses do not operate on New Year's Day, Presidents’ Day, Easter, Memorial Day, Independence Day, Labor Day, Thanksgiving Day and Christmas Day; Service will end at 17:15 hrs. on Christmas Eve and New Year's Eve.
 Cash fare to ride trolley bus is $0.50. Passengers can also pay by Trolley Tokens, which are sold in Value Packs to provide savings to riders.

Commuter Shuttle

 Commuter Shuttles do not operate on Weekends, New Year's Day, Presidents’ Day, Memorial Day, Independence Day, Labor Day, Thanksgiving Day and Christmas Day.
 Cash fare to ride Commuter Shuttle is $0.50, or free to passengers with the valid Metrolink ticket or pass.

External links

Public transportation in Los Angeles County, California
Bus transportation in California
Transportation in Los Angeles County, California
El Monte, California